Woodford Green Preparatory School is a preparatory school in Woodford Green, London. It was founded in 1932 to provide a non-denominational Christian education for boys and girls. The first headmistress was Norah Kathleen Read. The current headmaster is Jonathan P. Wadge.

Notable alumni
Tony Robinson (b. 1946), actor who played Baldrick in the Blackadder series

David Cracknell (b. 1968), journalist and former political editor of the Sunday Times

Paul Farmer (b. 1950), devised first public exam in pop music for schools

References

External links
 Woodford Green Preparatory School Website
 Profile on the Independent Schools Council website

Educational institutions established in 1932
1932 establishments in England
Private co-educational schools in London
Private schools in the London Borough of Redbridge
Preparatory schools in London